The Men's 1998 European Amateur Boxing Championships were held in Minsk, Belarus from May 17 to May 24. The 32nd edition of the bi-annual competition, in which 180 fighters from 38 countries participated this time, was organised by the European governing body for amateur boxing, EABA.

Medal winners

MEDAL TABLE

External links
Results
EABA Boxing

Boxing Championships
European Amateur Boxing Championships
B
European
Sports competitions in Minsk
1990s in Minsk
May 1998 sports events in Europe